Poliaenus batesi is a species of beetle in the family Cerambycidae. It was described by Linsley in 1933. It is known from Guatemala.

References

Pogonocherini
Beetles described in 1933